The Capt. Oliver Emerson Homestead is a historic house at 133 North Street in Methuen, Massachusetts.  The -story wood-frame house was built c. 1775 by Oliver Emerson, a locally notable leader of American Revolutionary War forces.  The house is built on a rubble foundation, and features a large central chimney that is typical of Georgian houses.  It is located on one Methuen's early roads, and is one of a few remaining houses that predate the height of the city's development in the mid 19th century.

The house was listed on the National Register of Historic Places January 20, 1984.

See also
 National Register of Historic Places listings in Methuen, Massachusetts
 National Register of Historic Places listings in Essex County, Massachusetts

References

Houses in Methuen, Massachusetts
Houses completed in 1775
National Register of Historic Places in Methuen, Massachusetts
Houses on the National Register of Historic Places in Essex County, Massachusetts